Umagami Tameike Dam is an earthfill dam located in Yamagata Prefecture in Japan. The dam is used for irrigation. The catchment area of the dam is  km2. The dam impounds about 10  ha of land when full and can store 1244 thousand cubic meters of water. The construction of the dam was completed in 1986.

References

Dams in Yamagata Prefecture
1986 establishments in Japan